John Charles Dias Bandaranaike  was a Ceylonese lawyer and legislator. He was the Sinhalese member of the Legislative Council of Ceylon.

Born to Jacabus Dias Wijewardena Bandaranaike, Mudaliyar of Governor Gate and translator of the Supreme Court. His brothers include Sir Harry Dias Bandaranaike and the Rev Canon Samuel William Dias Bandaranaike. Educated at the Colombo Academy, Dias Bandaranaike became a proctor. He succeeded his uncle J. G. Philipsz Panditaratne as the Sinhalese representative in the Legislative Council of Ceylon along with his brother Sir Harry Dias Bandaranaike in 1861.

See also
Bandaranaike family

References

Citations

Bibliography

 

Members of the Legislative Council of Ceylon
Sinhalese politicians
Alumni of Royal College, Colombo
Sinhalese lawyers
Ceylonese proctors